Papiine gammaherpesvirus 1 (PaHV-1), commonly known as baboon lymphocryptovirus, is a species of virus in the genus Lymphocryptovirus, subfamily Gammaherpesvirinae, family Herpesviridae, and order Herpesvirales.

This species was the first Lymphocryptovirus isolated from a non-human primate to be described.

References

External links
 

Gammaherpesvirinae